Glenn Cronin (born 14 September 1981) is an Irish football coach and former player who is currently assistant coach at Shamrock Rovers in the League of Ireland Premier Division.

Club career

Exeter City
A product of Irish junior club Cherry Orchard's well-regarded Youth Academy, Cronin made his debut in 2001, before going onto become a key part of Exeter's first team, playing in central midfield. Following the Grecians' relegation from the English Football League in 2003 he was made club captain, and despite injury problems that kept him out for much of the 2004/05 season.

Chester City
In July 2006, Cronin signed a contract with Football League Two club Chester City. He missed much of the 2006/07 season with a foot injury. After working his way to recovery, a further foot injury in July 2007 ultimately 
caused Chester to release him from his contract on 21 November 2007.

Bohemians
Cronin signed for Bohemians on 27 February 2008 and slotted seamlessly into the side as Bohs marched to the 2008 Premier Division title. Cronin also added an FAI Cup winners medal as Bohs achieved the "Double" by beating Derry City on penalties after a 2–2 draw. The 2009 season was also a successful one for Cronin when, firstly, the Gypsies won the League of Ireland Cup by beating Waterford United 3–1 at the RSC. The success did not end there though as Bohemians won their first back-to-back titles in the club's 119-year history, beating rivals Shamrock Rovers by 4 points. Despite winning the Setanta Sports Cup, Bohemians had a disappointing 2010 season where the club lost their league title on goal difference and failed to make an impact in Europe where they made an embarrassing exit to Welsh side The New Saints. Cronin was one of the club's bright spots though as he had his best season at Bohs to date.

Shelbourne
Following financial cutbacks at Bohemians at the end of the 2011 season, Cronin departed Bohemians after four successful seasons to join newly promoted local rivals Shelbourne for the 2012 season.

Other
Cronin has represented the Republic of Ireland at youth and levels.

Career statistics

Correct as of 26 October 2012.

Competitions include UEFA Champions League, UEFA Europa League and UEFA Intertoto Cup
Competitions include Football League Trophy, FA Trophy, Setanta Sports Cup and Leinster Senior Cup

Honours
Bohemians
League of Ireland: 2008, 2009
FAI Cup: 2008
League of Ireland: 2009
Setanta Sports Cup: 2009–10

References

External links

1981 births
Living people
Association football midfielders
Republic of Ireland association footballers
Republic of Ireland youth international footballers
Republic of Ireland expatriate association footballers
Expatriate footballers in England
Association footballers from Dublin (city)
English Football League players
National League (English football) players
League of Ireland players
Exeter City F.C. players
Chester City F.C. players
Bohemian F.C. players
Shelbourne F.C. players
Cherry Orchard F.C. players